H. M. Wynant (born Chaim Weiner; February 12, 1927) is an American film and television actor.

Biography
Wynant was born in Detroit, Michigan to Bessie and Jacob Weiner from Zabolotiv Poland.He made his feature film debut as an Indian in Samuel Fuller's Run of the Arrow (1957). In the 1958 Walt Disney film Tonka, Wynant played Yellow Bull, a Sioux Indian, who was the cousin of White Bull, played by Sal Mineo, and is killed at the Battle of the Little Big Horn.

Among his many other film credits are Run Silent, Run Deep (1958); The Slender Thread (1965); Track of Thunder (1967); The Helicopter Spies (1968); Marlowe (1969); Conquest of the Planet of the Apes (1972); The Horror at 37,000 Feet (1973); Hangar 18 (1980); Earthbound (1981); and Solar Crisis (1990). He played a villain who fought Elvis Presley in the 1963 film, It Happened at the World's Fair.

Among his many television credits are appearances on shows such as Playhouse 90, Sugarfoot, Hawaiian Eye, Combat!, The Wild Wild West, Perry Mason, The Twilight Zone,
Daniel Boone, Gunsmoke, Frontier Circus, Get Smart, Hawaii Five-O, The Big Valley , Hogan's Heroes, Bat Masterson in a 1958 episode where he again played a renegade Indian chief, Mission: Impossible, Quincy, M.E., and Dallas.

He was cast as General Philip Sheridan in the 1961 episode, "The Red Petticoat", on the syndicated anthology series, Death Valley Days, hosted by Stanley Andrews. In the storyline, Sheridan's friendship with Indian scout Kahlu (Allen Jaffe) (1928–1989) is questioned after a number of ambushes result in dead troopers. Sheridan sticks to his instincts and defends his ally against the enraged residents of the fort.

In recent years, he has been a member of Larry Blamire's stock company, playing authoritative figures in several of Blamire's features and shorts, such as a Pentagon general in The Lost Skeleton Returns Again and a weird psychiatrist in Dark and Stormy Night. He returned to the big screen in 2011 in Footprints for which he was nominated as Best Supporting Actor at the Method Fest Independent Film Festival.

Partial filmography

Sweet Smell of Success (1957) - Patron at Toots Shor's (uncredited)
Run of the Arrow (1957) - Crazy Wolf
Decision at Sundown (1957) - Spanish
Oregon Passage (1957) - Black Eagle
Run Silent, Run Deep (1958) - Corpsman Hendrix (uncredited)
Tonka (1958) - Yellow Bull
It Happened at the World's Fair (1963) - Vince Bradley
The Wheeler Dealers (1963) - Bo Bluedog (uncredited)
The Slender Thread (1965) - Doctor Morris
Track of Thunder (1967) - Maxwell Carstairs
The Search for the Evil One (1967)
Sail to Glory (1967) - Capt. Dick Brown
The Helicopter Spies (1968) - The Aksoy Brothers (archive footage)
Marlowe (1969) - Sonny Steelgrave
Conquest of the Planet of the Apes (1972) - Hoskyns
The Horror at 37,000 Feet (1973, TV Movie) - Frank Driscoll
The Last Tycoon (1976) - Man at Dailies (uncredited)
Grand Jury (1976) - Mr. Potter
Hangar 18 (1980) - Flight Director
Earthbound (1981) - Dave
Solar Crisis (1990) - IXL executive #1
The Big Empty (1997) - J.W. McCreedy
Whigmaleerie (2005) - Hector MacDougall
Trail of the Screaming Forehead (2007) - Dr. Applethorpe
The Lost Skeleton Returns Again (2008) - General Scottmanson
Dark and Stormy Night (2009) - Dr. Van Von Vandervon
Yesterday Was a Lie (2009) - Art Patron
Footprints (2011) - Victor
Marafon (2013) - David
The Adventures of Biffle and Shooster (2015) - 'Montague Shaw' as Andrew
Living Room Coffin (2018) - Terry

References

External links
 
 James Arness! Elvis! "Run of the Arrow"! Being Bad with H.M. Wynant A WORD ON WESTERNS

1927 births
Living people
Male actors from Michigan
American male film actors
American male television actors
20th-century American male actors
Jewish American male actors
21st-century American Jews